Yamamotoyama may refer to:

 Yamamotoyama (tea company), a Japanese tea company
 Yamamotoyama Ryūta

ja:山本山 (曖昧さ回避)